Mahur Rural District is a rural district (dehestan) in Mahvarmilani District, Mamasani County, Fars Province, Iran. At the 2006 census, its population was 5,614, in 1,287 families.  The rural district has 76 villages.

References 

Rural Districts of Fars Province
Mamasani County